Luzius Rüedi (12 June 1900 – 19 July 1993) was a Swiss ice hockey player who won a bronze medal in the 1928 Winter Olympics.

He was born in Thusis, Switzerland and died in Zürich, Switzerland.

Rüedi was a member of the Swiss ice hockey team, which won the bronze medal. The team finished behind Canada and Sweden in the 1928 Olympics.

References

External links
 profile

1900 births
1993 deaths
HC Davos players
Ice hockey players at the 1928 Winter Olympics
Olympic bronze medalists for Switzerland
Olympic ice hockey players of Switzerland
Olympic medalists in ice hockey
Medalists at the 1928 Winter Olympics
Otolaryngologists
Swiss surgeons
Academic staff of the University of Zurich
20th-century surgeons
Sportspeople from Graubünden